Prabhjot Kaur (6 July 1924 – 24 November 2016), was a Punjabi author and poet.

Biography
She was born in Gujrat, British India.

Kaur married Narenderpal Singh, who was also a writer and novelist. She lived in Defence Colony, New Delhi. She had two daughters, Anupama & Nirupma. Nirupma was married to Harinder Singh, son of Hukam Singh, First speaker of Parliament. Anupama was married to former Indian Army Chief J.J.Singh.

Books and poems
 Plateau
 Dreams die young 
 Pabbī : Pañjābī kavitā-saṅkalana
 Zindagī de kujha pala 
 Kiṇake
 Madhiāntara
 Candara yuga : kawitāwāṃ
 Khāṛī 
 Kandhárí hawá 
 Bolaṇa dī nahīṃ jā we aṛiā

Awards and honours 
 Kaur, along with her husband Narenderpal Singh, won the Sahitya Akademi Award in 1964 for her collection of poems, "Pabbi". 
 Padma Shri award, 1967.
 "La Rose de France" award, 1968
 Poetry Society of America has decorated her with Distinguished Order of Poetry.
Nominated to the Vidhan Parishad of Punjab.
Member of UNESCO

References 

1924 births
2016 deaths
Women writers from Gujarat
Recipients of the Sahitya Akademi Award in Punjabi
Recipients of the Padma Shri in literature & education
20th-century Indian women writers
20th-century Indian poets
Indian women poets
Punjabi-language writers